The 2021 AFC Cup knockout stage was played from 25 August to 5 November 2021. A total of 8 teams competed in the knockout stage to decide the champions of the 2021 AFC Cup. Teams from ASEAN Zone did not compete in the knockout stage, due to the cancellation of group stage matches in ASEAN Zone.

Qualified teams
The following teams advanced from the group stage:
The winners of each of the three groups and the best runners-up in the West Asia Zone (Groups A–C) advanced to the Zonal semi-finals.
The winners of each group in the South Asia Zone (Group D), and the East Asia Zone (Group J) advanced to the Inter-zone play-off semi-finals.
The winners of each group in the Central Asia Zone (Groups E–F) advanced to the Zonal finals.

Format

In the knockout stage, the eight teams played a single-elimination tournament. Each tie was played as a single match. Extra time and penalty shoot-out were used to decide the winners if necessary (Regulations Article 9.3 and 10.1).

Schedule
The schedule of each round is as follows (W: West Asia Zone; C: Central Asia Zone). Matches in the West Asia Zone will be played on Mondays and Tuesdays, while matches in the Central Zone and the Inter-zone play-offs will be played on Tuesdays and Wednesdays.

Bracket
The bracket of the knockout stage was determined as follows:

Zonal semi-finals

Summary

The West Asia Zonal semi-finals were played over one leg, with the home team determined by the draw mechanism based on which group runners-up qualify. If a group winner played a group runner-up, the group winner hosted the match. If two group winners played each other, one of the group winner (whose group runner-up qualify) hosted the match.

|+West Asia Zone

|+ASEAN Zone

West Asia Zone

Zonal finals

Summary

The West Asia and Central Asia Zonal final were played over one leg, with the home team decided by draw. The winners of the West Asia Zonal final advanced to the final, while the winners of the Central Asia Zonal final advanced to the Inter-zone play-off semi-finals.

|+West Asia Zone

|+Central Asia Zone

|+ASEAN Zone

West Asia Zone

Central Asia Zone

Inter-zone play-off semi-finals

Summary

After matches in ASEAN Zone was cancelled, there were only three teams which qualified to the Inter-zone play-off semi-finals, i.e., the winners of the South Asia Zone (Group D), the winners of the East Asia Zone (Group J), and the winners of the Central Zonal final. The three Zonal champions were drawn into two pairings where one club got a bye to the Inter-zone play-off final, which happened for Lee Man. The matchups and order of legs decided by draw, without any seeding with the winner of Central Zonal Final hosting the match and the winner of South Asia Zone being the away team.

Matches

Inter-zone play-off final

Summary

In the Inter-zone play-off final, the two teams which advanced from the Inter-zone play-off semi-finals played each other, with the order of legs determined by the Inter-zone play-off semi-final draw. The winners of the Inter-zone play-off final advanced to the final.

Matches

Final

The final was played over one leg, between the winners of the West Asia Zonal final and the winners of the Inter-zone play-off final. The home team was determined on a rotation basis, with the match hosted by the winners of the West Asia Zonal final, as in the case of odd-numbered years (Regulations 9.1.2).

References

External links
, the-AFC.com
AFC Cup 2021 , stats.the-AFC.com

3
August 2021 sports events in Asia
September 2021 sports events in Asia
October 2021 sports events in Asia
November 2021 sports events in Asia